Bagljaš is a part of the city of Zrenjanin. It is named after a Slovakian family named Bagljas which used to have vineyards in that area. The family still has descendants in the village of Aradac. One part of the area was a graveyard that during the Second World War became a place where fascist occupiers systematically killed partisans and patriots, among whom was the famous Sonja Marinković. A monument has been erected and the graveyard removed.

Bagljaš was urbanised after the Second World War as a "city inside a city" so that it has a particular urban wholeness. It consists of the New and Old Bagljaš, which are separated by the Boulevard of Veljko Vlahović. It is often considered as Zrenjanin's version of the New Belgrade.

Bagljas has more than 20,000 inhabitants and is the biggest part of Zrenjanin. There is a primary school, "Petar Petrovic Njegoš", kindergarten "Crvenkapica", a health center and a new secondary medical school. It lies on the exit from Zrenjanin towards Novi Sad. City's Hospital is located at the entrance of Bagljas. West of Bagljas is located a new urban industrial zone and new commercial center. Administratively, the neighborhood is split into two: the North, called after the Sonja Marinković and the South, Veljko Vlahović.

"Aviv Park", the Zrenjanin's only shopping mall, has opened in Bagljas in 2015. The most advanced five star cinema in Serbia with four multiplex screens, "Cinestar" is located within Bagljas.

There is also a Zrenjanin sport airport, where famous competitions of scooter such as European Championship in free flying.

Orthodox Church "Ascension of Christ" is being built in Bagljas, the first orthodox temple in Zrenjanin after 200 years.

References

External links
 https://web.archive.org/web/20100307061213/http://www.bagljas.org.rs/

Populated places in Serbian Banat
Zrenjanin